The 2022–23 Women's England Hockey League season (sponsored by Vitality) is the 2022–23 season of England's field hockey league structure and England Hockey Women's Championship Cup.

The season started on 24 September 2022. Surbiton are the defending league champions and Beeston are the defending cup holders.

2022–23 teams

Premier Division

Division One South

Division One North

Current tables

Premier Division

Division One South

Division One North

England Hockey Women's Championship Cup

Quarter-finals

Semi-finals

Final 
Lee Valley Hockey and Tennis Centre

Conference divisions
Below the top three divisions are four Conference divisions - Midlands, North, East and West.

Conference East

Current standings

Updated to match(es) played on 16 October 2022.

See also
2022–23 Men's England Hockey League season

References

2022-23
England
2022 in English sport
2023 in English sport